Prairie Point, also known as Prairie, is a ghost town in Houston County, Texas, United States.  It is located at the intersection on FM 230 and County roads 3615 and 3520.

History 
Prairie Point was established around the 1850s.  In 1857, a post office was established in the area.  In the 1930s, a school, a church, and a few houses were in the area. By World War II, most residents moved away.  It became of a ghost town by the 1960s.

Education 
Prairie Point had a school from 1897 to around World War II, Prairie Point had a school.  Students are now bused to Lovelady Independent School District.

References

External links
Prairie Point, TX (Houston County) at The Handbook of Texas Online

Geography of Houston County, Texas
Ghost towns in East Texas
1850 establishments in Texas